The Enhanced Defense Cooperation Agreement (EDCA) is an agreement between the United States and the Philippines intended to bolster the American–Philippine alliance. The agreement allows the United States to rotate troops into the Philippines for extended stays and allows the United States to build and operate facilities on Philippine bases for both American and Philippine forces. The U.S. is not allowed to establish any permanent military bases. The Philippines have personnel access to American ships and planes.

The EDCA is a supplemental agreement to the previous Visiting Forces Agreement. The agreement was signed by Philippine Defense Secretary Voltaire Gazmin and U.S. Ambassador to the Philippines Philip Goldberg in Manila on April 28, 2014, preceding a visit by U.S. President Barack Obama that same day. On January 12, 2016, the Philippine Supreme Court upheld the agreement's constitutionality in a 10–4 vote. On July 26, 2016, the Philippine Supreme Court ruled with finality that the agreement is constitutional.

Evan Medeiros, the U.S. National Security Council's senior director for Asian affairs was quoted in The Washington Post as saying, "This is the most significant defense agreement that we have concluded with the Philippines in decades."

Background

For more than a century, the Philippines has been important to American defense strategy. Currently, the Philippines is a "major non-NATO ally" of the United States.

The U.S. acquired the Philippines from Spain after the Spanish–American War of 1898 and then fought the Philippine–American War against Philippine revolutionaries to secure their rule. After both wars, the Philippines was a territory of the United States from 1898 to 1946. The United States granted the Philippines independence in 1946.

The Mutual Defense Treaty was signed in 1951 and ratified in 1952 by the governments of the United States and the Philippines. The purpose of the Treaty was to "strengthen the fabric of peace" in the Pacific, by formally adopting an agreement to defend each other's territory in the case of external attack. In line with this treaty, the United States maintained several military bases in the Philippines, including Subic Bay Naval Base and the Clark Air Base. In 1992, the bases closed after the Philippine Senate rejected, by a close vote, a treaty that would have extended the bases' lease. The treaty was rejected because of U.S. reluctance to set a firm time frame for troop withdrawal and to guarantee that no nuclear weapons would pass through the base.

The Philippines–United States Visiting Forces Agreement (VFA) was signed by the governments of the Philippines and the United States in 1998, and came into effect in 1999. This was the first military agreement since the closing of U.S. bases in 1992. The VFA outlined a set of guidelines for the conduct and protection of American troops visiting the Philippines. The Agreement also stipulated the terms and conditions for American military to pass through or land in Philippine territory. The VFA is a reciprocal agreement in that not only does it outline the guidelines for U.S. troops visiting the Philippines but also for Philippine troops visiting the United States.

The signing of the VFA led to the establishment of annual bilateral military exercises between the U.S. and the Philippine known as Balikatan, as well as a variety of other cooperative measures. The Balikatan training exercises ("shoulder-to-shoulder") are annual military exercises between the U.S. and the Philippines. They are structured to maintain and develop the security relationship between the two countries' armed forces through crisis-action planning, enhanced training to conduct counterterrorism operations, and promoting interoperability of the forces.

Over the years the exercises have expanded to include other surrounding countries in Southeast Asia. The trainings have also had a shifting focus. During the U.S.-led "War on Terror" the annual Balikatan Exercises focused on training for counterterrorism missions. There has been some controversy over these exercises; a growing number of Philippine people are angry over the continued presence of U.S. troops in the Philippines.

Disaster relief and crisis response has since become an important focus of the U.S.–Philippine security relationship especially following Typhoon Haiyan (Yolanda), and is a key impetus of the EDCA agreement. The United States Marines were among the first to arrive in the Philippines after the devastating typhoon hit the Philippines on November 8, 2013. At the immediate request of the Philippine government, U.S. and international relief agencies arrived three days after the storm to provide aid and assistance to the thousands of injured and homeless. The United States government provided over $37 million in aid.

Summary of the agreement
According to Ambassador Goldberg, the goal of the EDCA is to "promote peace and security in the region." While outlining new defense-cooperation measures, the agreement also allows for the United States to respond more quickly to environmental and humanitarian disasters in the region.

Designed to supplement the 1951 Mutual Defense Treaty and the 1999 Visiting Forces Agreement, the EDCA reaffirms mutual cooperation between the United States and the Philippines to develop their individual and collective capacities to resist armed attack by: improving interoperability of the two country's armed forces, promoting long-term modernization, helping maintain and develop maritime security, and expanding humanitarian assistance in response to natural disasters.

The agreement allows for U.S. forces and contractors to operate out of "agreed locations," which are defined as: "facilities and areas that are provided by the Government of the Philippines through the Armed Forces of the Philippines (AFP) and that United States forces, United States contractors, and others as mutually agreed". The Agreement "codifies the conditions of limited military cooperation between the Philippines and the United States." It hands over all operational controls of these "Agreed Locations" to the United States, and allows U.S. forces to pre-position and store defense materiel, equipment, and supplies. The Agreement makes clear that this materiel cannot include nuclear weapons.

The EDCA is effective for an initial period of ten years, and thereafter, it shall continue in force automatically unless terminated by either Party by giving one year's written notice through diplomatic channels of its intention to terminate the agreement (Article XII, Sec. 4 of EDCA). While the U.S. forces may exercise operational control, put troops and equipment, construct facilities, and be accommodated in certain agreed locations, the Philippines shall still retain ownership of the agreed locations (Article V, Sec. 1 of EDCA). Importantly, the United States is not allowed to establish any permanent military bases, and must hand over any and all facilities in the "agreed locations" to the Philippine government upon the termination of the agreement.

The agreement also stipulates that the U.S. is not allowed to store or position any nuclear weapons on Philippine territory.

Agreed locations
In April 2015, the United States Government asked for access to eight bases in the Philippines, including the formerly American Subic Bay Naval Base and Clark Air Base, as well as bases on Cebu, Luzon, and Palawan.

On March 19, 2016, the Philippines and the United States government agreed on the 5 locations of military bases for the American troops under the EDCA: Antonio Bautista Air Base (Palawan), Basa Air Base (Pampanga), Fort Magsaysay (Nueva Ecija), Lumbia Airport (Cagayan de Oro),  Benito Ebuen Air Base  (Mactan, Cebu).

In 2017, Philippine president Rodrigo Duterte warned the U.S. that he would unilaterally abrogate EDCA because he received information that American forces were building permanent arms depots to house arms that might include nuclear tipped weapons, in violation of the agreement and of the Philippine constitution. Both the U.S. ambassador and the Philippine Armed Forces provided assurances that this was not the case, but this and other questions delayed implementation for a year.

Implementation
In January 2019 the United States and the Philippines officially completed the first major project under the EDCA at Cesar Basa Air Base in Pampanga province, north of Manila. The United States and the Philippine government are working on future EDCA projects at four other locations - Fort Magsaysay Military Reservation in Nueva Ecija province north of Manila, Lumbia Air Base in Cagayan de Oro province in the southern Philippines, Antonio Bautista Air Base in Puerto Princesa in Palawan, and Mactan Benito Ebuen Air Base in Cebu province.

In February 2021, presidential spokesman Harry Roque said that Duterte had linked the fate of the Philippines–United States Visiting Forces Agreement to "behavior" of Americans toward Fiipinos and said regarding the EDCA, "I think the president wants this to stop... He needs to think about whether to drop EDCA also because that is the legal basis that allows American soldiers and equipment to remain in our country".

In 2022, under President Bongbong Marcos, the Department of National Defense announced that they will speed up implementation of the agreement, allowing the assignment of U.S. troops to the country for extended periods and developing new projects at existing and new EDCA locations.

In late 2022, the U.S. requested access to five additional locations, one each in Palawan, Zambales and Isabela and two sites in Cagayan. On February 2, 2023, four additional locations of military bases were designated under the EDCA, but the locations were not announced, pending consultations with local officials having jurisdiction over the sites.

See also
 Balikatan
 Mutual Defense Treaty (United States–Philippines)

References

External links
 Full text of "Document: Enhanced Defense Cooperation Agreement" on Philippine Government's Official Gazette at gov.ph.
 Q & A on Enhanced Defense Cooperation Agreement on Philippine Government's Official Gazette at gov.ph.

Military alliances involving the Philippines
Military alliances involving the United States
2014 in the United States
United States military in the Philippines
Philippines–United States relations
21st-century military alliances
2014 in the Philippines